Live in Middelheim 1999 is a live album by John Zorn's Masada recorded in Antwerp, Belgium.

Reception
The Allmusic review by Steve Loewy awarded the album 4½ stars stating "Every album by John Zorn's Masada seems better than the last, and this one is no exception. By the time of this recording the group was a tightly cohesive unit, performing at an extremely high and satisfying level... With a recording time nearing 80 minutes, and substantial contributions from the entire quartet, the recording marks not so much a milestone in the life of the group as a symbol of its ability to constantly expand upon itself and draw on its not inconsequential roots".

Track listing
All compositions by John Zorn
 "Nevuah" – 9:48 
 "Sippur" – 3:20
 "Hath-Arob" – 5:20
 "Kedushah" – 6:53
 "Ne’eman" – 13:05
 "Karet" – 2:03
 "Kochot" – 4:57
 "Piram" – 12:13
 "Paran" – 6:00
 "Ashnah" – 7:19
 "Tahah" – 7:26

Personnel
Masada
John Zorn – saxophone
Dave Douglas – trumpet
Greg Cohen – bass
Joey Baron – drums

References

Albums produced by John Zorn
Masada (band) albums
John Zorn live albums
1999 live albums
Tzadik Records live albums